Məmmədsalam Haciyev (born 8 July 1972) is an Azerbaijani wrestler. He competed at the 1992 Summer Olympics and the 1996 Summer Olympics.

References

External links
 

1972 births
Living people
Azerbaijani male sport wrestlers
Olympic wrestlers of Azerbaijan
Olympic wrestlers of the Unified Team
Wrestlers at the 1992 Summer Olympics
Wrestlers at the 1996 Summer Olympics
Place of birth missing (living people)